Car 99 is a 1935 American thriller film directed by Charles Barton and written by Karl Detzer and C. Gardner Sullivan. The film stars Fred MacMurray, Ann Sheridan, Guy Standing, Marina Koshetz, Dean Jagger, William Frawley and Frank Craven. The film was released on March 2, 1935, by Paramount Pictures.

Plot
A story of the Michigan State Police and the strong sense of loyalty and duty it instills in its men. It follows the career of a newly-inducted rookie, Ross Martin, who has joined the force at the urging of his sweetheart, Mary Adams. Martin soon distinguishes himself by his bravery in the apprehension of criminals. But when the leader of a gang of bank robbers falls into his hands and then escapes, because of carelessness on Martin's part, he is suspended from the force.

Cast 
Fred MacMurray as Trooper Ross Martin
Ann Sheridan as Mary Adams
Guy Standing as John Vilker
Marina Koshetz as Nan Vilker
Dean Jagger as Trooper Jim Burton
William Frawley as Training Sgt. Barrel
Frank Craven as Sheriff Peter Arnot
Nora Cecil as Granny Adams
Charles C. Wilson as Trooper Captain Ryan
Joe Sawyer as Whitey
Mack Gray as Smoke
Eddy Chandler as Trooper Haynes
Robert Kent as Trooper Blatzky
John Howard as Trooper Carney
Alfred Delcambre as Trooper Jamison
Russell Hopton as Dispatch Operator Harper
Howard Wilson as Dutch

References

External links 
 

1935 films
1930s English-language films
American thriller films
1930s thriller films
Paramount Pictures films
Films directed by Charles Barton
American black-and-white films
American police films
1930s American films